The Trinity Square Historic District is a historic district in the Elmwood neighborhood of Providence, Rhode Island.  It includes four properties on the south and west side of Trinity Square, the triangular junction of Elmwood Avenue and Broad Street.  The visual focal points of the district are the Grace Church Cemetery, which is located south of the square, and the Trinity United Methodist Church, an imposing Gothic Revival structure built in the mid-1860s to a design by Clifton A. Hall.  North of the church stands the Clifton Hall Duplex, designed and occupied by Hall, and the James Potter House, an elaborate Queen Anne mansion built c. 1889 and designed by Stone, Carpenter & Willson.

The district was listed on the National Register of Historic Places in 1980.

Grace Church Cemetery

Grace Church cemetery is a triangular parcel of land located at the intersection of Broad Street and Elmwood Avenue. The church purchased four acres here in 1834, and doubled its size in 1843. A caretaker's cottage was built 1859-1860 in the Gothic Revival style. The cottage, part of the Providence Landmark District, was restored several times: in 1982, 2008, and again in 2010. The cemetery is a frequent target of vandalism, with many toppled and broken gravestones. The Cemetery was listed as one of Rhode Island's "most endangered properties" by the Providence Preservation Society for several years.

World-renowned soprano Matilda Sissieretta Joyner Jones is buried in the Grace Church cemetery.

See also
National Register of Historic Places listings in Providence, Rhode Island

References

Historic districts in Providence County, Rhode Island
Geography of Providence, Rhode Island
National Register of Historic Places in Providence, Rhode Island
Historic districts on the National Register of Historic Places in Rhode Island